Mátraszentimrei dalok is a collection of songs after Hungarian folk tunes by Hungarian composer György Ligeti. They are strongly influenced by fellow composer Béla Bartók, who also used Hungarian folk songs as his basis for some of his compositions.

Composition and premiere 

As Ligeti did with most of his early vocal compositions, this collection of pieces was composed in Budapest in 1955, but it was not premiered until June 9, 1984. The premiere took place in Saarbrücken, with  conducting the Kammerchor Hausen. It was published by Schott Music.

Analysis 

The whole collection takes approximately 4 minutes to perform and consists of four folk songs. The movements are:

The composition is scored for a 2-part (in movements one, two, and three) and a 3-part (in movement four) children's choir, regardless of it being a boys' choir or a girls' choir. However, professional adult female singers have been used for most public performances and recordings. Ligeti stated in the original score that the last movement can be transposed one tone higher for women's choirs. The text has also been translated into English by Desmond Clayton.

See also 
 List of compositions by György Ligeti

References

External links 
 A preview of the score

Compositions by György Ligeti
1955 compositions
Contemporary classical compositions
Choral compositions